Bulbophyllum sect. Biflorae is a section of the genus Bulbophyllum.

Description
Species in this section is distinguished by its 2 flowered inflorescence.

Distribution
Plants from this section are found in Southeast Asia.

Species
Bulbophyllum section  Biflorae comprises the following species:

References

Orchid subgenera